is the 49th single by the J-pop group Morning Musume, released in Japan on April 11, 2012.

Background
"Ren'ai Hunter" is the second single for the 10th generation members and the last single by Morning Musume to feature Risa Niigaki. It also became the last single to feature Aika Mitsui, who would announce her graduation from the group due to a foot injury that was taking a long time to recover.

Release details
The single will be released in six versions: a regular edition and five limited editions. The Regular Edition and the Limited Editions D and E are CD-only. The Limited Editiona A, B, and C come with a DVD containing a special version of the music video for the title song.

The Limited Edition E is a special version to commemorate Risa Niigaki's graduation from Morning Musume. It contains an additional song, performed by her. The song is a cover of "Egao ni Namida (Thank You! Dear My Friends)" from Aya Matsuura's 2002 album First Kiss. As the group's producer Tsunku wrote in his comment about the single, the song is Risa Niigaki's favourite, although it is not a Morning Musume's song; she would always listen to it at the time when she was still a freshly joined member.

All the limited editions include an entry postcard for a lottery to win a ticket to one of two single's launch events; one will be held on April 28 in the Kansai region, and the other on May 3 in the Kanto region. So, the Limited Edition D contains the same tracks as the Regular Edition, but sports a different cover and includes a lottery card.

Composition
The title track is an electropop song with a dubstep-influenced arrangement.

Morning Musume's producer Tsunku explained that he made an electronic dance music song with deep bass, wanting to create an opposite of the previous single "Pyoco Pyoco Ultra".

Also, Tsunku has revealed that the coupling track "Watashi ga Ite Kimi ga Iru" is an energetic song.

Music video
Aika Mitsui didn't participate in the dance parts of the video due to leg injury.

In her close-up at the end of the music video, Risa Niigaki says silently: "Morning Musume daisuki" ("I love Morning Musume very much").

The music video was published on March 21 on Morning Musume's official YouTube channel.

On Sunday, March 25, Tanaka Reina wrote in her blog that, in the YouTube most-viewed video rankings, "Ren'ai Hunter" was currently at number 1* in Japan and at number 8* in the world.

* in the daily YouTube Charts for Music

Members at time of single
 5th generation: Risa Niigaki 
 6th generation: Sayumi Michishige, Reina Tanaka
 8th generation: Aika Mitsui 
 9th generation: Mizuki Fukumura, Erina Ikuta, Riho Sayashi, Kanon Suzuki
 10th generation: Haruna Iikubo, Ayumi Ishida, Masaki Sato, Haruka Kudo

Watashi ga Ite Kimi ga Iru Vocalists

Main Voc: Risa Niigaki, Reina Tanaka

Center Voc: Sayumi Michishige, Riho Sayashi, Ayumi Ishida

Minor Voc: Aika Mitsui, Mizuki Fukumura, Erina Ikuta, Kanon Suzuki, Haruna Iikubo, Masaki Sato, Haruka Kudo

Watashi ga Ite Kimi ga Iru Vocalists

Main Voc: Risa Niigaki, Reina Tanaka

Center Voc: Sayumi Michishige, Mizuki Fukumura, Riho Sayashi

Minor Voc: Aika Mitsui, Erina Ikuta, Kanon Suzuki, Haruna Iikubo, Ayumi Ishida, Masaki Sato, Haruka Kudo

Track listing

Regular Edition, Limited Editions A, B, C, D

Limited Edition E: Risa Niigaki Graduation Edition

Bonus
Sealed into the Limited Editions A, B, C, D, E:
 Event ticket lottery card with a serial number

Charts

DVD single 
The corresponding DVD single is titled "Single V 'Ren'ai Hunter'".
 Track listing

* from

References

2012 singles
Japanese-language songs
Morning Musume songs
Songs written by Tsunku
Song recordings produced by Tsunku
Zetima Records singles
2012 songs
Japanese synth-pop songs
Dance-pop songs
Torch songs